The 1938 VPI Gobblers football team represented Virginia Agricultural and Mechanical College and Polytechnic Institute in the 1938 college football season.  The team was led by their head coach Henry Redd and finished with a record of three wins, five losses and two ties (3–5–2).

Schedule

Players

Roster

Varsity letter winners
Twenty-one players received varsity letters for their participation on the 1938 VPI team.

References

VPI
Virginia Tech Hokies football seasons
VPI Gobblers